The Chan rearrangement is a chemical reaction that involves rearranging an acyloxy acetate (1) in the presence of a strong base to a 2-hydroxy-3-keto-ester (2).

This procedure was employed in the Holton Taxol total synthesis.

Reaction mechanism 

The methylene bridge in the reactant with adjacent carbonyl and acetyl substituents is acidic and can be deprotonated by strong non-nucleophilic bases such as lithium tetramethylpiperidide or lithium diisopropylamide (LDA) as in an aldol reaction. The thus formed enolate then gives a nucleophilic acyl substitution with the adjacent carbonyl of the acetyl group through a short lived intermediate oxirane. Acidic workup liberates the free hydroxyl group.

References 
  Rearrangement of α-acyloxyacetates into 2-hydroxy-3-ketoesters S. D. Lee, T. H. Chan, and K. S. Kwon Tetrahedron Lett. 1984,  25, 3399-3402.
   First total synthesis of taxol 1. Functionalization of the B ring Robert A. Holton, Carmen Somoza, Hyeong Baik Kim, Feng Liang, Ronald J. Biediger, P. Douglas Boatman, Mitsuru Shindo, Chase C. Smith, Soekchan Kim, et al.; J. Am. Chem. Soc. 1994, 116(4), 1597-1598.

See also 
 Darzens reaction

Carbon-carbon bond forming reactions
Rearrangement reactions
Name reactions